John Rutledge Bermingham (November 7, 1923 — May 29, 2020) was an American politician who served in the Colorado Senate from 1965 to 1973 as a Republican.

Early life and education
Bermingham was born in Lake Forest, Illinois on November 7, 1923. He served in the United States Navy during World War II.

Bermingham attended Yale University and Columbia Law School, graduating from the latter in 1949.

Career
Bermingham served as a prosecutor for the United States District Court for the Southern District of New York. In 1953, he moved Denver, Colorado, where he practiced oil and gas law.

Bermingham served in the Colorado Senate from 1965 to 1973 as a Republican. He sponsored legislation with future governor Richard Lamm that made Colorado the first state to liberalize its abortion laws. The legislation also promoted environmental legislation.

Bermingham resigned in 1973 to be Governor John D. Vanderhoof's Assistant for Environmental Affairs from 1973 to 1975, when he was appointed by Governor Lamm to chair the Colorado Land Use Commission.

Personal life and death
Bermingham married Marcia Dines in 1954. He had three children with her before they divorced in 1966.

Bermingham was founder and president of the Colorado Population Coalition. After serving in the Colorado Legislature, he was a board member of the Rocky Mountain Center of the Environment. While in his 80s, Bermingham taught courses at the University of Denver on population sustainability.

Bermingham wrote and privately published a book on global sustainability. He also wrote biographies pertaining to his grandparents and their families.

Bermingham was pro-choice.

Bermingham died of natural causes at the age of 96 on May 29, 2020.

References

1923 births
2020 deaths
20th-century American politicians
Republican Party Colorado state senators
Politicians from Chicago
Lawyers from Chicago
Lawyers from Denver
New York (state) lawyers
United States Navy personnel of World War II
Military personnel from Illinois